Nam-Gyu Park (born 1960, Hangul: 박남규) is Distinguished Professor and Sungkyunkwan University (SKKU)-Fellow at School of Chemical Engineering, SKKU. His research focuses on high efficiency mesoscopic nanostructured solar cells.

Education
Park received his B.S. degree in chemical education in 1988, M.S. in 1992 and Ph.D. degrees in chemistry in 1995 from Seoul National University.

Career
Park worked as postdoctoral researcher at the Institut de Chimie de la Matiere Condensee de Bordeaux – Centre National de la Recherche Scientifique (ICMCB-CNRS), France, from 1996 to 1997 and at National Renewable Energy Laboratory, USA, from 1997 to 1999. He joined SKKU as a full professor of School of Chemical Engineering in 2009.

Awards and honors
2010 – DuPont Science and Technology Award (DuPont Korea)
2017 – Clarivate Citation Laureates (Clarivate Analytics)
2018 – Ho-Am Prize in Engineering (Ho-Am Foundation)
2022 – Rank Prizes  for Optoelectronics

References

South Korean scientists
South Korean chemists
1960 births
Living people
Recipients of the Ho-Am Prize in Engineering
Seoul National University alumni
Academic staff of Sungkyunkwan University